Cirripectes viriosus, the robust blenny, is a species of combtooth blenny found in the western central Pacific ocean, around the Batan Islands and the Philippines.  This species reaches a length of  SL.

References

viriosus
Taxa named by Jeffrey T. Williams
Fish described in 1988